Kerry Leimer, known as K. Leimer professionally, is an American electronic musician from Seattle, Washington. Active since the 1970s, Leimer primarily self-released his music for several decades, and became more generally known after his music was collected and reissued by the label RVNG Intl in the 2010s.

Leimer was born in Winnipeg, Manitoba, and his family moved to Chicago in his childhood. In 1967 the family moved again to Seattle, where he began making experimental music using inexpensive instruments and magnetic tape manipulation. He released some material on Robert Carlberg's Anode Productions before starting the label Palace of Lights with his spouse Dorothy Cross in 1979. After 1983 he ceased producing music for many years, returning in 2002 to reissue old work and release new material. In 2014, RVNG compiled the first of several reissue packages of his work, A Period of Review. From this time forward Leimer made new material as well, both solo and in collaboration.

References

Living people
American electronic musicians
Musicians from Seattle
Musicians from Winnipeg
Canadian emigrants to the United States
Year of birth missing (living people)